Secretary of Energy may refer to:

United States Secretary of Energy, head of the US Department of Energy
Secretary of Energy (Philippines), head of the Philippine Department of Energy
The head of the Secretariat of Energy (Mexico)

See also
Energy minister, equivalent positions in various countries